Yi Saek (Korean: 이색, Hanja: 李穡, 17 June 1328 – 17 June 1396), also known by his pen name Mogeun (Korean: 목은), was a Korean writer and poet. His family belonged to the Hansan Yi clan. Yi Saek played a crucial role in the introduction and localisation of philosophy of Zhu Xi. He studied Neo-Confucianism in Yuan Dynasty China and opened an academy after his return to Goryeo, and from his academy the founders of Joseon Dynasty were educated.

Many of his disciples, such as Jeong Do-jeon and Gwon Geun, used Neo-Confucianism as the ideological basis for overthrowing the Buddhist kingdom of Goryeo and establishing Confucian Joseon. However, Yi Saek himself remained loyal to the Goryeo Dynasty and didn't believe the wiping out of Buddhism, as Jeong Do-jeon insisted, would be of any benefit. Yi Saek believed in the co-existence of the "Three Disciplines": Confucianism, Buddhism and Taoism. Yi Saek resigned from all political positions after the founding of the Joseon Dynasty.

Not much is known about how he died, but some say that he was murdered while crossing a bridge, like Jeong Mong-ju (four years earlier in 1392). When he was offered the position of Prime Minister by Yi Seong-gye, Yi Saek turned the offer down and told him that he could not serve two kings (of Goryeo and Joseon). Yi Seong-gye subsequently ordered his men to kill him if he was not able to cross the bridge in time, and if he does cross it in time, to let him go. He died because he didn't cross the bridge in time.

Yi Saek left various poetry, essays and letters compiled in The Collected Works of Mogeun.

Family 

 Grandfather 
 Yi Ja-seong (이자성, 李自誠)
 Grandmother 
 Lady Yi of the Wolsan Yi clan (울산 이씨, 蔚山李氏)
 Father
 Yi Gok (이곡, 李穀) (25 August 1298 - 28 January 1351)
 Mother 
 Lady Kim of the Hamchang Kim clan (함창 김씨, 咸昌金氏)
 Grandfather - Kim Taek (김택, 金澤)
 Wife and children
 Lady Gwon of the Andong Gwon clan (안동 권씨)
 Son - Yi Jong-hak (이종학)
 Son - Yi Jong-seon (이종선)
 Daughter-in-law - Lady Gwon (권씨); daughter of Gwon Geun (권근)
 Grandson - Yi Gye-ju (이계주)
 Great-Grandson - Yi Gae (이개) (1417 - 1456)
 Grandson - Yi Gye-rin (이계린) (1401 - 1455) 
 Granddaughter-in-law - Lady Yi of the Cheongju Yi clan (정경부인 청주 이씨, 貞敬夫人 淸州 李氏)
 Grandson - Yi Gye-jeon (이계전)
 Grandson - Yi Gye-won (이계원)

In popular culture
 Portrayed by Lee Dae-ro in the 1983 MBC TV series The King of Chudong Palace.
Portrayed by Jeon In-taek in the 2005–2006 MBC TV series Shin Don.
 Portrayed by Park Ji-il in the 2014 KBS1 TV series Jeong Do-jeon.
 Portrayed by Kim Jong-soo in the 2015-2016 SBS TV series Six Flying Dragons.

See also
List of Korean philosophers
Yi Ji-ham

References

Korean Confucianists
Korean male poets
1328 births
1396 deaths
14th-century Korean philosophers
14th-century Korean poets
14th-century Korean calligraphers